That Royle Girl is a 1925 American silent comedy film directed by D. W. Griffith and released by Paramount Pictures. The film was based on the novel of the same name by Edwin Balmer, and starred Carol Dempster, W. C. Fields and Harrison Ford. It is now considered lost.

Plot
As described in a film magazine review and other references, a poor mannequin from the slums of Chicago fancies she is in love with a jazz music composer and orchestra leader who is married but does not live with his wife. One night his wife is murdered and the modiste’s assistant is held as a material witness because she is known to have been friendly with the musician. After he is improperly convicted and sentenced to death for murder, she succeeds in clearing him just as he is to be hanged. Only then does she learn that she loves the district attorney who secured the conviction. Her love of him is reciprocated.

Cast

Production
This film, along with Sally of the Sawdust, marked Griffith's return to working for an important Hollywood studio like Paramount Pictures, something he had not experienced since leaving Biograph in 1914, though his independently produced features were released through Triangle, Paramount, and United Artists. He also had to work with a tight shooting script as Paramount executives Adolph Zukor and Jesse L. Lasky insisted the film be brought on schedule and on budget.

Griffith had been a founding partner in Triangle Studios in 1915 and United Artists in 1919, and these ventures allowed him leeway in the way he made films. However, now the leisurely approach to filmmaking Griffith had enjoyed at his own Mamaroneck, Long Island, New York studio was gone. Griffith had been for all intents and purposes an independent producer since leaving Biograph. Griffith shot That Royle Girl on locations across Chicago. The film's climactic sequence, a devastating tornado, was filmed on a football field at Paramount's Astoria Studio in Queens, New York, where Griffith created a fully built village. Griffith used the power of 24 airplane propellers to recreate the wreckage and ruin of the tornado's fury.

While the production was underway, Griffith added W. C. Fields to the cast for a comedy relief supporting role as the heroine's inebriated stepfather.

Preservation
No print of That Royle Girl is known to exist. In 1980, the American Film Institute included this title among its list of the “Ten Most Wanted” lost films of all time.

See also
 List of lost films

References

External links

Hard to find lobby poster
That Royle Girl (the novel) on Wikisource, which the film was based on

1925 films
1925 comedy films
Silent American comedy films
American silent feature films
American black-and-white films
Films based on American novels
Films directed by D. W. Griffith
Films set in Chicago
Films shot in Chicago
Lost American films
Lost comedy films
Paramount Pictures films
Films shot at Astoria Studios
1925 lost films
1920s American films